Curry Sicong Tian is a Chinese film director, writer and multidisciplinary artist based in Los Angeles. She won Student Academy Award for her short film, Simulacra, in 2020.

Life and career
Curry was born and raised in China. She holds an MFA in animation and digital art from the University of Southern California and a degree from Tsinghua University in Journalism and Visual Communication. She has directed commercials for Mercedes-Benz, Beats Electronics and Canon Inc.

Filmography

Awards and nominations

References

External links
 
 

Living people
Year of birth missing (living people)
Chinese film directors